Jayanto Chattopadhyay (born 28 July 1946) is a Bangladeshi actor and reciter. He studied in English literature from Calcutta University. He portrayed the famous character Misir Ali in a television drama named Trishna.

Works

Films
 Adam Surat (1989)
 Kittonkhola (2000)
 Matir Moina (2002) (The Clay Bird)
 Joyjatra (2004)
 Ontarjatra (2006)
 Nirontor (2006)
 Banshi (2007)
 Noy Number Bipod Sanket (2007)
 The Last Thakur (2008)
 Runway (2010)
 Opekkha (2010)
 Ghetuputra Komola (2012)
 Pita - The Father (2012)
 Shikhandi Kotha (2013)
 Sutopar Thikana (2015)
 Matir Projar Deshe (2018)
 Padmar Prem (2019)
 Kagojer Phul (TBA)
 Amar Ache Jol (2008)
 Krishnopokkho (2016)
 Birotto (2022)

Drama serials
 Bishaash (2010)
 Kala Koitor (2012)

Dramas
 Trishna
 Lilaboti
 Khela

Web series

See also
 Cinema of Bangladesh
 Bangladeshi film actor

References

External links
 

1946 births
Bengali Hindus
Bangladeshi Hindus
Male actors in Bengali cinema
Bangladeshi television personalities
Living people
21st-century Bangladeshi male actors
Bengali male television actors
University of Calcutta alumni
People from Satkhira District
Recipients of the Ekushey Padak